San Dionisio, officially the Municipality of San Dionisio, is a 4th class municipality in the province of Iloilo, Philippines. According to the 2020 census, it has a population of 39,048 people.

The Quiniluban Island, Tago Island and Igbon Island, extinct valconic islands known for coral reef scuba diving and beach ecotourism, lie in the east across the Concepcion Bay. The Mount Opaw, with the clear views of ocean and islands, is the tallest range with gentle slope with a single peak with trails in several directions to ascent.

History

During the Spanish Colonization of Philippines, a native leader named "Dionisio" had cleared the forest land to create a settlement called "Lakdayan". In 1877 Spanish arrived and renamed "Lakdayan" to "Dionisio" in the honor of humble fisherman founder of the settlement. Spanish converted the natives and appointed St. Vincent Ferrer as Patron Saint of the settlement. Spanish set up the municipality at Concepcion, of which Dioniso was a part of. During Spanish times, the head of the local government of Concepcion was titled "Kapitan" (captain) and the subordinate leaders in San Dionisio were titled "Tenientes" (lieutenant) and hereditary Cabeza de Barangay (head of barangay). Eventually Sara was carved out of Concepcion to establish an eponymous municipality, which also included Dionisio as one of the constituent barangay of Sara. In 1920, San Dionisio municipality was established after carving it out of Sara municipality.

Geography

Barangays
San Dionisio is politically subdivided into 29 barangays.

Climate

San Dionisio has intermediate tropical climate, relatively dry from December to April and wet for the rest of the year. Northeast monsoon and trade winds cause the dry and sunny weather. Southeast monsoons and cyclone storms cause the wet and stormy conditions. January is the coldest month during the relatively cool tropical period from December to February. April to June summer season has the warmest temperature. High tropical temperature and the sea on eastern side cause the high relative humidity.

Demographics

Economy

See also
 Tourism in the Philippines

References

External links
 [ Philippine Standard Geographic Code]
 Philippine Census Information
 Local Governance Performance Management System

Municipalities of Iloilo